Fabio Castillo Figueroa (10 March 1921 – 4 November 2012) was a Salvadoran politician who was a member of the Junta of Government, which ruled the country from 26 October 1960 until 25 January 1961.

He died on 4 November 2012, at the age of 91.

References 

1921 births
2012 deaths
Salvadoran politicians